"Roll Me Up and Smoke Me When I Die" is a Willie Nelson single from his 2012 album Heroes. The song written by Willie Nelson, Buddy Cannon, Rich Alves, John Colgin and Mike McQuerry, features vocals by Snoop Dogg, Kris Kristofferson and Jamey Johnson.
 
It was released on April 20, 2012 on 420 day, a counterculture holiday in North America related to cannabis culture. It became the first released single from the album. The same day, Nelson performed the song during the unveiling ceremony of his statue in Austin, Texas.

Initially, the album was to be named Roll Me Up and Smoke Me When I Die, after the single. The name was later changed to Heroes, after Nelson and his production team decided that the original name could deter some conservative sales outlets from carrying the album. Besides its regular release, the single was also made available in a green-colored 7" vinyl, in support of Record Store Day with a special previously unreleased solo version of the song performed by Willie Nelson.

Side A: "Roll Me Up and Smoke Me When I Die" - Album version by Willie Nelson featuring Snoop Dogg, Jamey Johnson & Kris Kristofferson
Side B: "Roll Me Up and Smoke Me When I Die" - Solo Version by Willie Nelson

References

2012 songs
Willie Nelson songs
Songs written by Willie Nelson
Songs written by Buddy Cannon
Song recordings produced by Buddy Cannon
2012 singles
Songs written by Rich Alves